Gaizka Garitano Aguirre (born 9 July 1975) is a Spanish former professional footballer who played as a midfielder, currently manager of SD Eibar.

Over 11 seasons as a player, he amassed Segunda División totals of 315 matches and 37 goals, mainly with Bilbao Athletic and Eibar. In La Liga, he represented Real Sociedad during the 2005–06 and 2006–07 campaigns.

Garitano entered coaching in 2009 with Eibar, being put in charge of the first team in 2012. He won consecutive promotions in his first two years, and reached the top division with the club in 2014. In the competition, he also managed Deportivo and Athletic Bilbao.

Playing career
Garitano was born in Bilbao, Basque Country. Grown through the ranks of Athletic Bilbao, he would never make it past the reserves, his sole first-team appearance being as a late substitute in a UEFA Cup win away to UC Sampdoria in 1997. He also served loans at UE Lleida and SD Eibar.

In the summer of 1999, Garitano joined Segunda División B team CD Ourense. He finally settled at Eibar in the Segunda División – his second spell – and, in the 2004–05 season, as captain, led the side to a fourth place in the league, with chances of a historic La Liga promotion until the last matchday.

Garitano made his first top-flight appearances with Real Sociedad at the age of 30, his debut coming on 27 August 2005 in a 3–0 away defeat in the Basque derby. After three seasons in San Sebastián, during which the club was relegated in 2007, he joined neighbours Deportivo Alavés, retiring in June 2009 at 34 after their relegation to the third division.

Coaching career

Eibar
Immediately after retiring, having appeared in more than 300 matches in Spain's second tier, Garitano moved into coaching, serving as assistant at also recently-relegated Eibar. After a stint in charge of the reserves he was appointed first-team manager for the 2012–13 campaign, which included the elimination of Athletic Bilbao – the previous year's finalists – from the Copa del Rey, and ended with promotion.

Garitano repeated the feat the following season, topping the table and leading Eibar to the club's first ever top-division promotion. In June 2014, he renewed his contract.

In 2014–15, the team collected 27 points from the first 19 games but, after only eight in the following 19, was finally relegated back in spite of a 3–0 home win over Córdoba CF in the last matchday (they would  later be reinstated at the expense of Elche CF). Subsequently, Garitano presented his resignation, stating he did not merit to continue.

Valladolid and Deportivo
Garitano signed with Real Valladolid on 6 July 2015, replacing fired Rubi. On 21 October, as the side ranked dead last, he was dismissed.

On 10 June 2016, Garitano took over for Víctor Sánchez as Deportivo de La Coruña manager. Eight months later, with  the team inside the relegation zone, he was sacked.

Athletic Bilbao
In summer 2017, Garitano was appointed head coach of Bilbao Athletic, replacing José Ángel Ziganda who had been promoted to manager of the first team. He remained in that position until 4 December 2018, when it became his turn to be handed the senior role after Eduardo Berizzo, who had followed on from Ziganda's one-year stint, was also relieved of his duties after an even shorter spell.

On 4 April 2019, Garitano agreed to an extension at the San Mamés Stadium to run until 30 June 2020. On 1 June of the following year, having led the side to their first Spanish Cup final since 2015, he further renewed his link.

Garitano was fired on 3 January 2021, with the team in ninth.

Return to Eibar
On 7 June 2021, Garitano returned to Eibar on a two-year deal with the option of a third. José Luis Mendilibar had stepped down following the side's relegation to division two.

Personal life
During his playing spell with Eibar, Garitano studied to become a journalist before beginning his sports coaching courses. He is the son of Angel Garitano (also known as 'Ondarru') who served for many years as assistant to Mané at managerial appointments including Alavés and Athletic Bilbao, and the nephew of former Athletic and Real Zaragoza midfielder Ander Garitano; they are distantly related to Juan Urquizu who also served Athletic as player and manager, while Gaizka's mother's family members include another man who performed both roles, Koldo Aguirre.

Garitano is not related to fellow Basque manager Asier Garitano, who also had playing spells with Bilbao Athletic and Eibar.

Managerial statistics

Honours

Manager
Eibar
Segunda División: 2013–14

References

External links
Real Valladolid profile  

1975 births
Living people
Spanish footballers
Footballers from Bilbao
Association football midfielders
La Liga players
Segunda División players
Segunda División B players
Bilbao Athletic footballers
Athletic Bilbao footballers
UE Lleida players
SD Eibar footballers
CD Ourense footballers
Real Sociedad footballers
Deportivo Alavés players
Basque Country international footballers
Spanish football managers
La Liga managers
Segunda División managers
Segunda División B managers
SD Eibar managers
Real Valladolid managers
Deportivo de La Coruña managers
Athletic Bilbao B managers
Athletic Bilbao managers